Arcana is a manga series written and illustrated by Yua Kotegawa. It was adapted into a live action film in 2013.

Plot
Murakami is a police detective who is assigned to investigate a serial bombing at Shuei Elementary, he and his partner Nakabayashi learn that a doctor from a mental institution called on behalf of one of his patients about the explosion minutes before the bomb went off. This leads to Murakami's meeting with the nameless and amnesic patient whom they would eventually call "Maki", who appears to communicate with deceased spirits of the dead that tell her things which no living human would know. Murakami tries to uncover the secret behind the Maki as she helps him and Nakabayashi deal with a series of supernatural crimes by a mass murderer that are occurring. But as Murakami finds himself falling in love, he learns of Maki's true nature and her connection to an identical woman named Satsuki.

Characters
 Maki (Tao Tsuchiya)
 Satsuki (Tao Tsuchiya)
 Murakami (Masataka Nakagauchi)
 Mieko Tomochika (Mitsuki Tanimura)
 Yutaka Hashi (Goro Kishitani)  
 Nakabayashi (Takuya Uehara)
 Michiru (Kaito)
 Gaku Torikawa (Hajime Taniguchi)
 Munemitsu Kobayashi (Masahiro Noguchi)
 Taguchi (Masashi Taniguchi)

References

External links

Shueisha manga
Seinen manga
Manga adapted into films
Live-action films based on manga
Japanese supernatural films
Japanese crime thriller films